José Macia, better known as Pepe (born 25 February 1935) is a Brazilian former football player and manager. He is considered one of the greatest players in the history of Santos FC and one of the greatest left wingers of all time, being two-time World Champion in 1958 and 1962 and two-time World-Club Champion in 1962 and 1963 helping Santos FC defeat the iconic SL Benfica of Eusébio and the Milan of Cesare Maldini, Trapattoni, Rivera, Amarildo and Altafini in a best-of-three final.

Pepe spent his entire club playing career with Brazilian side Santos Futebol Clube (1954–1969), scoring 405 goals in 750 league appearances for the club making him the second best top scorer in the history of Santos FC only behind Pelé, who scored 1,091 goals.

His nickname was "Canhão da Vila" (The Vila Cannon), because of his potent kick with his left leg and the fact that Santos plays in the Urbano Caldera Stadium, nicknamed Vila Belmiro. He joked that he was "the greatest Santos striker on the planet – because Pelé is from Saturn".

Early life
At the age of seven, in 1942, Pepe moved with his family to the neighboring city of São Vicente. With his brother, Mário, he started playing football with the teams in the neighborhood where he lived, Comercial FC and Mota Lima. And it was during this period that his left foot started to stand out.

At the age of 16 Pepe was playing for São Vicente AC when Cobrinha, the team's goalkeeper, who also defended Santos' kids, invited him to perform a test at Alvinegro. On 4 May 1951 Pepe stepped on the lawn of Vila Belmiro for the first time, and was approved by coach Salu.

Between the years of 1952 and 1953 Pepe was already under the command of coach Lula, and in 1954, at the age of 19, he had his first chance on the main team. In the junior squad, he varied his position between the left midfielder and the left wing, but in the pros he decided for the left wing and took over the position for many years until the end of his career.

Club career
He debuted on 23 May, in a match against Fluminense, in Pacaembu, for the Rio-São Paulo Tournament. The Santos team lost 2-1, and Pepe entered the second half in the place of Boca, who had already taken the place of Del Vecchio.

His first great moment as a professional athlete was in the 1955 Paulista Championship. In the last match of the event, Pepe scored the triumph goal against Taubaté, in Vila Belmiro, and with the victory Santos became Paulista Champion for the second time, exactly 20 years after the birth of the young left-winger. By that time, the power of his left foot was already known, which is why he earned the nickname Canhão da Vila. Goals from fouls and penalties became frequent. And on three occasions his left boot also provided olympico goals. (scored directly from a corner kick)

Among the outstanding matches in his career, Pepe likes to highlight the second of the 1963 Intercontinental Cup matches against Milan, at the Maracanã. In the first game, in Milan, Santos lost 4 to 2. In the second, they were losing 2 to 0 at the end of the first half, but the Alvinegro club returned determined in the second half and completely turned the match around to 4 to 2, the same scoreline of the first match. Canhão da Vila scored two goals, both with his powerful left leg, taking a free kick. In the third and decisive match of the Intercontinental Cup (predecessor to the FIFA Club World Cup), which was again played at Maracanã, Peixe won by 1 to 0, with a penalty goal by Dalmo. As Pelé was out of the game due to injury, Pepe would play a huge role in getting the trophy for Santos.

A year earlier, in Lisbon, Santos had become club world champions for the first time after defeating Benfica, who were 2-time defending European champion. Pepe considers this match to be the best in Santos history. Santos beat Eusébio's team 5-2, at the iconic Estádio da Luz. Pelé scored three times, with Coutinho and Pepe scoring one goal each.

On top of the 2 World Cups, Pepe won 25 official club titles, including 11 São Paulo Championships, six Brazilian Championships, 2 Copa Libertadores de América, 2 Intercontinental Cups, and 4 Rio-São Paulo Tournaments, becoming the player with most titles won at a single club. 
He also holds the record for most wins in the São Paulo Championships, with 13 titles won (11 as Santos player, one as Santos coach and one as coach of Internacional de Limeira), Canhão da Vila is also the record holder for total Brazilian Championships, with 7 titles - six as a Santos player and one as a São Paulo coach.

Disciplined almost to the extreme, and despite being regularly hunted on the field by the most violent and malicious defenders, Pepe was never sent off from the field, and for this rare  discipline he received the Belfort Duarte trophy.

He held the undisputed command of the Santos left-wing until 1965, when he reached the age of 30. From there until 1969, the year in which he ended his career, he began to share playing time with the young Abel from a Rio de Janeiro club, and after 1966 with Edu, from the Santos academy.

Pepe is one of the rare examples of a player who spent his entire career on a single team. Pepe dedicated 15 years of his life to Santos' professional team, going so far as to refuse million dollar proposals and offers from Europe, to remain loyal to his club. Counting from his first year as a youth prodigy, until his last as a professional, he spent 18 years at the Santos sports club.

International career
Pepe was supposed to be the starting player for the Brazilian team in the 1958 and 1962 campaigns, but twice suffered injuries on the eve of the World Cup and was replaced by Zagallo. The first time, he suffered a blow to the ankle in a friendly match in Italy. In the second, he had a knee sprain in a friendly game at the Morumbi stadium. Pepe received 41 caps with the Brazil national football team, and won both the 1958 and 1962 World Cups. However, he did not appear in any matches in both tournaments.

Managerial career
Pepe has a long career as a coach that started in 1969 in the youth ranks of Santos, eventually taking over the main Santos FC team and managing several other Brazilian clubs, including São Paulo and Guarani and the great Portuguese club Boavista.

He coached Santos from 1972 to 1974, obtaining a Paulista State Championship title in 1973, then he went to Paulista FC, he returned to Santos between 1979-1980, then he went to San José and Náutico.

His coaching career brought him to Asia, where he coached in Japan and Qatar. He coached Al Sadd from 1983 till 1984, and succeeded in winning the Emir of Qatar Cup.

In 1985 he directed the Esporte Clube Fortaleza. At the beginning of 1986 he directed the modest Inter de Limeira and surprisingly obtained the Paulista State Championship, as a result of that great campaign a great like Sao Paulo signed him in mid-1986 to 1987, taking the Brazilian Series A Championship, on February 25, 1987. Then he directed the Boavista de Portugal from 1987 to 1989.

In 1989 he was called to lead the Peruvian soccer team that was preparing for the Italy 1990 qualifying rounds where he played a more than discreet role. He returned to Santos at the end of 89 until mid-91. He was in Japan from 1991 to 1993, with Verdi Kawasaki today Tokyo Verdy, being league champion in 93. He managed Guarani FC at the end of 1993, then he returned to Santos in 94, then promoted in 1995 to Atlético Paranaense, being champion of the Brazilian Serie B.

He also coached Al Ahli from 2004 till 2005, where Spanish legend Pep Guardiola was under his supervision.

The last club he led was Ponte Preta in 2006.

Honours

Player

Santos

Official Tournaments
Campeonato Paulista: 1955, 1956, 1958, 1960, 1961, 1962, 1964, 1965, 1967, 1968
Torneio Rio–São Paulo: 1959, 1963, 1964, 1966
Taça Brasil: 1961, 1962, 1963, 1964, 1965
Torneio Roberto Gomes Pedrosa: 1968
Copa Libertadores: 1962, 1963
Intercontinental Cup: 1962, 1963

Friendly Tournaments
 Torneio de Paris (França): 1960, 1961
 Taça das Américas: 1963
 Torneio Pentagonal do México: 1959
 Taça Tereza Herrera (Espanha): 1959
 Torneio de Valência (Espanha): 1959
 Torneio Dr. Mario Echandi (Costa Rica): 1959
 Torneio Giallorosso (Itália): 1960
 Quadrangular de Lima (Peru): 1960
 Torneio Itália 1961 (Itália): 1961
 Torneio Internacional da Costa Rica (Costa Rica): 1961
 Pentagonal de Guadalajara (México): 1961
 Torneio Internacional da Venezuela (Venezuela): 1965
 Hexagonal do Chile (Chile): 1965
 Torneio de Nova York (Estados Unidos): 1966

International
Brazil
FIFA World Cup: 1958, 1962
Roca Cup: 1957, 1963
Taça do Atlântico: 1956, 1960
Taça Bernardo O'Higgins: 1961
Taça Oswaldo Cruz: 1961, 1962

Manager
Santos
1973 Campeonato Paulista

 Fortaleza E.C.
1985 Campeonato Cearense

Inter de Limeira
Campeonato Paulista with Internacional de Limeira in 1986
1988 Brazilian Serie B Championship

São Paulo Futebol Clube
1986 Brazilian Serie A Championship

Tokyo Verdy
1991–92 Japan Soccer League

Atlético Paranaense
1995 Brazilian Serie B Championship

Numbers and records
 Biggest winner of the Paulista Championship with 13 titles won (11 as Santos player, 1 as Santos coach and 1 as Inter de Limeira coach.
 Biggest winner of the Brazilian Championship with 7 titles won (6 as Santos player and 1 as São Paulo coach).
 Second player who most played with the shirt of Santos with 750 games.
 Santos' second highest scorer with 405 goals.
 Fourth top scorer of Brazilian clubs behind Pelé with 1091, Roberto Dinamite with 620 and Zico with 500 goals.
 Twenty-third top scorer in the Brazilian Football Team with 22 goals.
 Fifteenth greatest scorer in the history of the Rio-São Paulo Tournament.
 Player who won more titles with the shirt of Santos with 27 official titles, one more than Pelé.

References

1935 births
Living people
Sportspeople from Santos, São Paulo
Brazilian footballers
Association football forwards
1958 FIFA World Cup players
1962 FIFA World Cup players
Copa Libertadores-winning players
FIFA World Cup-winning players
1989 Copa América managers
Brazil international footballers
Brazilian football managers
Brazilian expatriates in Peru
Brazilian expatriates in Japan
Expatriate football managers in Japan
Expatriate football managers in Qatar
Campeonato Brasileiro Série A managers
Santos FC players
Santos FC managers
Paulista Futebol Clube managers
Clube Atlético Mineiro managers
São José Esporte Clube managers
Clube Náutico Capibaribe managers
Associação Atlética Internacional (Limeira) managers
Fortaleza Esporte Clube managers
Al Sadd SC managers
São Paulo FC managers
Boavista F.C. managers
Peru national football team managers
Tokyo Verdy managers
Associação Portuguesa de Desportos managers
Guarani FC managers
Club Athletico Paranaense managers
Coritiba Foot Ball Club managers
Criciúma Esporte Clube managers
Associação Atlética Portuguesa (Santos) managers
Al Ahli SC (Doha) managers
Associação Atlética Ponte Preta managers
Clube do Remo managers